In the 1999–2000 season, 1. FC Kaiserslautern competed in the Bundesliga.

Season summary 
Kaiserslautern repeated last season's fifth place finish. The club could have aimed higher were it not for their poor defensive record - only the bottom four teams conceded more than Kaiserslautern's 59. Tragedy struck at the end of the season, as young defender Thomas Lechner was killed in a motorcycle accident.

Players

First-team squad 
Squad at end of season

Left club during season

Competitions

Bundesliga

League table

References

Notes 

1. FC Kaiserslautern seasons
Kaiserslautern